The Governor-General of Nigeria was the representative of the monarch of the United Kingdom in Colonial Nigeria from 1954 to 1960, and after Nigerian independence in 1960, the representative of the Nigerian head of state.

The office was created on 1 October 1954, when the Colony and Protectorate of Nigeria was created an autonomous federation within the British Empire. After independence in 1960, the Governor-General became the representative of the Nigerian monarch, and the office continued to exist till 1963, when Nigeria abolished its monarchy, and became a republic.

List of Governors-General of Nigeria

Flag of the Governor-General

References

Nigeria
Politics of Nigeria
Nigeria and the Commonwealth of Nations